Way of the Warrior is a fighting game developed by Naughty Dog and published by Universal Interactive Studios for the 3DO. It was released in North America on August 30, 1994.

Way of the Warrior features high resolution graphics, characters with detailed storylines, and ultra-violent finishing moves. Players have to combat different fighters, their own character's "shadow", and two bosses to achieve complete victory. Each character has a standard arsenal of offensive and defensive fighting moves, combination attacks, and special moves that kill the defeated opponent in an extreme manner. The game's soundtrack consists of music from the 1992 White Zombie album La Sexorcisto: Devil Music, Vol. 1.

Gameplay 

Similar to Street Fighter II: The World Warrior (1991) and Mortal Kombat (1992), players must fight to the death with any of the World Warriors to be sealed into "The Book of Warriors". Each character has a standard arsenal of offensive and defensive fighting moves, combination attacks, and special moves that kill the defeated opponent in an ultra-violent manner. The game also has several hidden characters that can be unlocked with secret codes.

Development
Naughty Dog founders Andy Gavin and Jason Rubin, while satisfied with their work on Keef the Thief (1989) and Rings of Power (1992) for Electronic Arts (EA), were discouraged by their loss of creative control and support from EA's marketing division, and decided to take a hiatus from the video game industry. Gavin pursued a PhD at the Massachusetts Institute of Technology (MIT), while Rubin moved to California intending to take up surfing. Rubin instead established a special effects company, initiating his involvement in 3D computer graphics. Rubin's company soon accepted a contract from Columbia Pictures to create a shot for the film Wolf (1994). Eight months after the start of their hiatus and before Rubin would begin work on Wolf, Gavin and Rubin received a call from EA founder Trip Hawkins, who disclosed his plan for a new disc-based console named the 3DO and offered the pair free development kits. Gavin and Rubin were quickly persuaded by the prospect of games made for a large and readily produceable format, thus bypassing the cartridge-printing decisions encountered with Rings of Power, and accepted Hawkins's proposal. After agreeing to create a game for the 3DO, Gavin and Rubin began development in 1993 without an attached publisher, and self-funded production with the money made from Rings of Power, amounting to $80,000. According to Rubin, Way of the Warrior marked Naughty Dog's exit from game making as a hobby and an entrance into game development as a profession. While they still lacked a business plan, Rubin insisted that designing instinctively was the "appropriate way to make games", while Gavin added that self-funding without the oversight of publishers pushed them to devote their time and resources more wisely.

Around the start of Way of the Warrior'''s development, fighting games such as Mortal Kombat, Street Fighter and Samurai Shodown had become popular in arcades and on home consoles. Rubin observed that the direct nature and smaller size of fighting games in comparison to role-playing games made them easier and quicker to make. Gavin explained that "You make one background and one character, you play against yourself, and you’ve got a playable game. You could start working out balance issues and play issues and stuff." Gavin and Rubin aimed to create an over-the-top and "slightly more comedic" Mortal Kombat, primarily inspired by a number of Hong Kong kung fu films they had watched together. Knowing that they would have to work in the same location to make the game, Rubin attempted to convince Gavin to move to Newport Beach, California. However, Gavin was still attending the MIT, and so convinced Rubin to come to Boston, acquiring an apartment for them to live and work in.

Although Gavin and Rubin intended to replicate Mortal Kombat's visuals with a digitized approach, their restricted budget disallowed a chroma key system or any kind of motion capture backdrop. Thus, they bought a cream-colored screen and nailed it to the living room wall, covering the apartment's only windows as well as the air conditioning vents. The position of the screen, improper lenses for their camera, and small size of the apartment complicated the filming process. To film the moves in the game, Rubin had to open the front door and shoot from the apartment hallway. This confused and disturbed their neighbors, who mistakenly believed that the pair were filming kinky pornographic films. Gavin and Rubin enlisted friends and family members to portray the game's characters; most of them worked for free, as Gavin and Rubin were unable to pay them. The game's costumes were thrown together and purchased from a single store in Boston's Chinatown, with Gavin and Rubin not knowing what a given character would look like until the uniform was at the register. Various items in the apartment also figured into the characters' costumes. In particular, the costume of the secret character Gulab Jamun (portrayed by Vijay S. Pande) consisted of a pillow case for his loincloth, a sheet for his turban, and a gem from a secondhand Jasmine dress-up kit. Two 1000-watt lights were used during filming despite the lack of ventilation caused by the screen; the apartment's temperature reached as much as 105 degrees while filming for the character Nikki Chan.  Tae Min Kim, who portrayed Chin "The Dragon" Liu, was killed in a cycling accident a year after the game's release, and received a dedication in Naughty Dog's subsequent game Crash Bandicoot.

The game's voices were recorded through the Apple Macintosh microphone jack. Gavin and Rubin created much of the kung fu vocalizations themselves, with Gavin spending nights working on audio processing. Rodney Brooks, at the time the head of the MIT's Artificial Intelligence lab, provided the voice of "Shaky" Jake Querious. Chin "The Dragon" Liu's voice was provided by David Liu, who was the valedictorian of the Harvard class of 1994 and was known as a prolific professional Street Fighter II player. Liu was also the game's lead tester, and would attempt to plug Way of the Warrior during television interviews about his time in Harvard. Gavin voiced Malcolm Fox and Kull, while Rubin voiced the Book Keeper and the High Abbot.

Marketing and release
Development took place over the course of 12 months on a total budget of $100,000. Although Gavin was being paid $14,000 a year to go through the MIT’s masters program, his and Rubin's financial and living situation deteriorated during production, and they sold their remaining belongings to get by while finishing the game. With their last $10,000, they rented a 3×3 space within the 3DO booth at the Winter Consumer Electronics Show to search for a publisher. Gavin and Rubin found themselves surrounded by games being marketed by publishers as "multimedia", which Rubin assessed as "lots of badly shot, interactive video, and weird semi-gaming crap"; Rubin then surmised that "They all realized too late that this stuff wouldn't sell and that they needed to be publishing real games. Unfortunately for them, there was only one real game that was nearing completion: our game Way of the Warrior".

As a result, a bidding war broke out between Universal Interactive, The 3DO Company, and Crystal Dynamics. Gavin and Rubin initially came closest to accepting Crystal Dynamics's offer, but discovered an internal divide between those who wanted to publish the game and those who wanted to purchase the game and use its engine to develop Samurai Shodown titles. Hawkins, representing 3DO, also tempted them into granting the rights by using his charisma and positivity, which Gavin informally described as his "reality distortion field"; Rubin claimed that Hawkins's persuasion skills appeared to affect everyone around him, particularly his employees. For this reason, they were hesitant to accept his offer despite their previous business experiences with him. Universal Interactive ultimately won the game's publishing rights by offering Naughty Dog a place on their lot and funding for three additional games, over which Naughty Dog would have creative freedom. Rubin reflected that "Had we gone with 3DO as an exclusive, it could have been the end of Naughty Dog".

Naughty Dog later worked with American Laser Games to develop an arcade version of the game; prototypes were built and tested, but were never released. Aside from the controllers, the arcade version was identical to the 3DO version, and even used a 3DO Interactive Multiplayer system for hardware.

 Reception Way of the Warrior first appeared on sampler discs as a non-playable demo for the consumer and playable demos were sent out to various magazines. While initial response was very positive, the final product received mixed reactions from the press. The game was praised for its graphics and fatalities. However, critics were quick to point out Way of the Warrior as an inferior clone of Mortal Kombat, panning its poor controls, character design, loading times, sound effects, and the timing of pulling special moves, as well as its shallow mechanics, with some negatively comparing it to Mortal Kombat as well as other games in the genre such as Primal Rage and Killer Instinct. The reviewers of Electronic Gaming Monthly gave the game an average score of 3.75 out of 10, praising the graphics, animation, and fatalities, but panning the controls, especially the difficulty in pulling off special moves. GamePro gave the game a negative review, citing dull character design, long load times, small sprites, weak sound effects, and shallow challenge. Contradicting Electronic Gaming Monthly, however, they asserted that "Executing the special moves is not hard". Next Generation reviewed the game, rating it two stars out of five, and stated that "Way of the Warrior only proves that no amount of music, 3D rendering and gore can make up for the basics like gameplay and good character design." By the standards of the 3DO, the game sold well according to Naughty Dog, outdoing the 3DO port of SNK's Samurai Shodown''.

References

Citations

Bibliography

External links

1994 video games
3DO Interactive Multiplayer games
3DO Interactive Multiplayer-only games
Cancelled arcade video games
Mortal Kombat clones
Naughty Dog games
Universal Interactive games
Fighting games
Video games about death games
Video games developed in the United States
Video games with digitized sprites
Multiplayer and single-player video games